The Zambia national korfball team is a member of the IKF, managed by the Korfball Federation of Zambia (KFZ), representing Zambia in korfball international competitions.

Tournament history

References

National korfball teams
Korfball
National team